The Ingoda (Ingedei; , Angida) is a river in Zabaykalsky Krai of Russia.

Geography
In its upper course it flows at the feet of the Khentei Range. Together with the Onon, it forms the Shilka. The Ingoda freezes in early November and stays frozen until late April. The city of Chita lies at the confluence of the Ingoda and the Chitinka. A major portion of the Trans-Siberian Railway lies along the Ingoda valley. The name derives from the Evenki word ingakta which means "river with pebbly and sandy banks". Lake Kenon, located in the western outskirts of Chita, is part of the Ingoda river basin.

See also
 Chersky Range (Transbaikalia)

References 

Rivers of Zabaykalsky Krai